Baileyton is a town in northern Greene County, Tennessee, United States. The population was 431 at the 2010 census, down from 504 at the 2000 census.

History
Originally called "Laurel Gap", the area was first settled in 1776. Many Families lived in Laurel Gap mostly farmers. Then a name change came about and it was called Bailey Town from 1892 till 1915. When the town became incorporated, in 1915, the W was dropped and the name changed to "Baileyton", which stems from Claudius and Thomas P. Bailey, two brothers who lived there.

Geography
Baileyton is located at  (36.328094, -82.830501), at the base of a rugged area of northern Greene County, just south of the Hawkins County line. Bays Mountain, part of the greater Ridge-and-Valley Appalachians, rises prominently to the north. The town is drained primarily by Gardner Creek and Hughes Branch, both tributaries of Lick Creek (which is in turn a tributary of the Nolichucky River).

Demographics

2020 census

As of the 2020 United States census, there were 436 people, 193 households, and 105 families residing in the town.

2000 census
As of the census of 2000, there were 504 people, 237 households, and 138 families residing in the town. The population density was 353.6 people per square mile (136.1/km2). There were 275 housing units at an average density of 192.9 per square mile (74.3/km2). The racial makeup of the town was 98.21% White, 0.99% African American, 0.20% Native American, 0.40% from other races, and 0.20% from two or more races. Hispanic or Latino of any race were 0.79% of the population.

There were 237 households, out of which 23.6% had children under the age of 18 living with them, 44.7% were married couples living together, 12.2% had a female householder with no husband present, and 41.4% were non-families. 36.3% of all households were made up of individuals, and 15.2% had someone living alone who was 65 years of age or older. The average household size was 2.13 and the average family size was 2.77.

In the town, the population was spread out, with 19.0% under the age of 18, 8.7% from 18 to 24, 25.4% from 25 to 44, 29.6% from 45 to 64, and 17.3% who were 65 years of age or older. The median age was 42 years. For every 100 females, there were 88.1 males. For every 100 females age 18 and over, there were 83.8 males.

The median income for a household in the town was $20,139, and the median income for a family was $34,375. Males had a median income of $26,389 versus $18,056 for females. The per capita income for the town was $12,410. About 13.1% of families and 20.4% of the population were below the poverty line, including 26.0% of those under age 18 and 25.9% of those age 65 or over.

Postal service
Baileyton does not have a post office. The closest post office is in Greeneville. Baileyton along with Greeneville and Tusculum share the ZIP code 37745.

Education
Schools in Baileyton are operated by the Greene County Schools:

Baileyton Elementary School – serves grades PK–5
North Greene High School – serves grades 9–12.

North Greene Middle School, formerly Ottway Elementary located in nearby Ottway now serves students in grades 6 to 8.

Economy
Most residents in Baileyton work in Greeneville or other nearby cities. There are several restaurants and gas stations off Interstate 81 exit 36. Several stores are also located in Baileyton.

Transportation
Baileyton is located off Interstate 81 exit 36, north of Greeneville. I-81 leads northeast  to Bristol and southwest  to Knoxville (via Interstate 40). State Route 172 connects Greeneville to Interstate 81 in Baileyton.

Van Hill Road (a former alignment of State Route 172) connects to State Route 347 which leads west to Rogersville and northeast to Kingsport.

Horton Highway is the main west-east road through Baileyton. It connects Baileyton with Tennessee State Route 70 west of town near Romeo and Tennessee State Route 93 east of Baileyton, north of Fall Branch.

Recreation
 Baileyton RV Park and Baileyton Golf Club

References

External links

Town charter

Towns in Greene County, Tennessee
Towns in Tennessee